The 2250 class are a class of diesel locomotives rebuilt by Queensland Rail's Redbank Railway Workshops in 2004.

History
The 2250 class are former 1550 class (6), 2130 class (all 11), and 2141 class (all 8) locomotives that were rebuilt in 2004.

The rebuilds included new cabs, Dash 2 electronics, ZTR traction control equipment, EMD 645E engines from 1502s and the replacement of the roots blower supercharger with a turbocharger.

20 locomotives were sold to Transnet in South Africa in 2014.

5 were brought back into Australia by GWA for use on the Whyalla network, releasing GWN class locomotives for service in Queensland.

References

Aurizon diesel locomotives
Co-Co locomotives
Diesel locomotives of Queensland
Diesel locomotives of Western Australia
Queensland Rail locomotives
Railway locomotives introduced in 2004
Diesel-electric locomotives of Australia
3 ft 6 in gauge locomotives of Australia